James McLeod may refer to:

 James William McLeod (1871–1931), Ontario farmer and political figure
 Jimmy McLeod (1937–2019), Canadian ice hockey player
 James McLeod (Medal of Honor), petty officer who received the Medal of Honor in 1862
 James McLeod (politician) (1882–1944), member of the New Zealand Legislative Council
 James C. McLeod (physician), physician from Florence County who ran in the South Carolina gubernatorial election, 1946
 James Walter McLeod (1887–1978), Scottish physician and bacteriologist.

See also
 James Macleod (1836–1894), Scottish-born Canadian politician and judge
 James Macleod (Royal Navy officer) (born 1970), British admiral
 James MacLeod (rower) (born 1953), British Olympic rower